Louisiana Technology Park is a business incubator in Baton Rouge, Louisiana. Also known as the Tech Park and LTP, the non-profit focuses on statewide economic development, nurturing early to mid-stage high-tech start-up companies and digital media firms. The Tech Park also offers meeting space for companies and businesses that are not housed within LTP. In 2012 alone, LTP's Training Lab was used for over 125 training sessions. Equipped with computers and printers, the training center is offered at no charge to non-profit and state agencies. There is a per day charge for-profit companies.

The Level Up Lab (www.leveluplab.com) is a project of Louisiana Technology Park, that aims to create and bring new digital media companies to Louisiana, building on Louisiana's focus on the digital media and high-tech sectors. Level Up Lab will help developers to turn ideas into reality while simultaneously creating a commercial viable product.

Buildings and structures in Baton Rouge, Louisiana